Seoul-forest station is a station on the Suin-Bundang Line, a commuter rail line of Korail. It is near Seoul Forest, a large park.

Seoul Metropolitan Subway stations
Metro stations in Seongdong District
Railway stations opened in 2012